William H. Grogan House is a historic home located at Brevard, Transylvania County, North Carolina.  It was built about 1890, and is a -story, gable-front and wing form frame farmhouse, with Late Victorian style decorative details.  It rests on a stone foundation and has a stepped, single shouldered, exterior stone chimney.

It was listed on the National Register of Historic Places in 2008.

References

Houses on the National Register of Historic Places in North Carolina
Victorian architecture in North Carolina
Houses completed in 1890
Houses in Transylvania County, North Carolina
National Register of Historic Places in Transylvania County, North Carolina